This is a list of all the yachts built by Bilgin Yachts, sorted by year.



Table

Under construction

See also
 List of motor yachts by length
 Luxury yacht

References

Bilgin Yachts
Built by Bilgin Yachts
Bilgin Yachts